André Bonin (10 March 1909 – 7 September 1998) was a French fencer. He won a gold medal in the team foil event at the 1948 Summer Olympics.

References

External links
 

1909 births
1998 deaths
French male foil fencers
Olympic fencers of France
Fencers at the 1948 Summer Olympics
Olympic gold medalists for France
Olympic medalists in fencing
Medalists at the 1948 Summer Olympics
20th-century French people